Derocher Peninsula is a snow-covered peninsula between Brahms Inlet and Mendelssohn Inlet on the north side of Beethoven Peninsula, Alexander Island, Antarctica. It was photographed from the air by the Ronne Antarctic Research Expedition, 1947–48, and mapped from these photographs by D. Searle of the Falkland Islands Dependencies Survey (FIDS), 1960. It was named by the Advisory Committee on Antarctic Names after Commander Paul J. Derocher, U.S. Navy, commanding officer, Antarctic Development Squadron Six (VXE-6), May 1985 to May 1986. Derocher Peninsula is one of the eight peninsulas of Alexander Island.

See also

 Eroica Peninsula
 Harris Peninsula
 Pesce Peninsula

References

Peninsulas of Alexander Island